Halstead's Bay (sometimes spelled Halsted's) is the westernmost bay of Lake Minnetonka. It is in the cities of Minnetrista and Mound, in Hennepin County, Minnesota. It is named for the settler Frank W. Halsted, who migrated to its shores in 1855. Its main tributary is Six Mile Creek that enters the bay from the west. Access to the bay is provided by a public boat launch along Halstead's Drive.

The bay is one of the last on Lake Minnetonka to see intensive modern residential development. It has the distinction of being downstream from the city of Saint Bonifacius, which did not adequately treat its sewage until the early 1980s, when it connected to the metropolitan area sewage system. Its northern and eastern shores in places have steep terrain leading down to the bay. Two examples are the Bluffs neighborhood on the north, and the Eagles Bluff area.

References

Bodies of water of Hennepin County, Minnesota
Bays of Minnesota